Janq'u Q'awa (Aymara janq'u white, q'awa little river, ditch, crevice, fissure, gap in the earth, "white brook" or "white ravine", Hispanicized spelling  Ancocahua) is a mountain in the Andes of Peru, about  high. It is located in the Cusco Region, Espinar Province, on the border of the districts of Condoroma and Ocoruro. Janq'u Q'awa lies southwest of Isankani and Aqhu Phichaqa.

References

Mountains of Peru
Mountains of Cusco Region